Antonia Dulčić (born 4 February 1997) is a Croatian footballer who plays as a defender for Italian Serie B club Napoli Femminile and the Croatia women's national team.

References

1997 births
Living people
Women's association football defenders
Croatian women's footballers
Croatia women's international footballers
Croatian Women's First Football League players
ŽNK Split players
S.S.D. Napoli Femminile players